RNE may refer to:
 Radio Nacional de España
 Registro Nacional de Estrangeiros
Russian National Unity (Russian Russkoe natsionalnoe edinstvo), neo-Nazi political party and paramilitary organization in Russia
 Russian National Exam